Tabat was chieftain of the Jarawa, a Berber of the Aures Mountains during the mid-7th century. He was the father of the Berber queen and warlord Dihya.

References

7th-century Berber people

Berber rulers